Wilsonville is a village in Macoupin County, Illinois, United States. The population was 536 at the 2020 census.

Geography
Wilsonville is located in southern Macoupin County at  (39.070124, -89.854243). Illinois Route 138 passes through the northwest side of the village, leading northeast  to Mount Clare and west  to Bunker Hill.

The West Fork of Cahokia Creek runs through a  ravine on the western edge of the village, flowing south to Cahokia Creek, a west-running direct tributary of the Mississippi River.

Demographics

As of the census of 2000, there were 604 people, 249 households, and 167 families residing in the village. The racial makeup of the village was 98.68% White, 0.17% Native American, 0.33% from other races, and 0.83% from two or more races. Hispanic or Latino of any race were 0.33% of the population.

There were 249 households, out of which 26.5% had children under the age of 18 living with them, 51.4% were married couples living together, 8.8% had a female householder with no husband present, and 32.9% were non-families. 30.1% of all households were made up of individuals, and 20.9% had someone living alone who was 65 years of age or older. The average household size was 2.43 and the average family size was 2.96.

In the village, the population was spread out, with 24.8% under the age of 18, 9.1% from 18 to 24, 25.5% from 25 to 44, 21.9% from 45 to 64, and 18.7% who were 65 years of age or older. The median age was 38 years. For every 100 females, there were 89.9 males. For every 100 females age 18 and over, there were 90.0 males.

The median income for a household in the village was $27,917, and the median income for a family was $34,688. Males had a median income of $35,313 versus $20,250 for females. The per capita income for the village was $15,089. About 9.1% of families and 9.8% of the population were below the poverty line, including 9.2% of those under age 18 and 6.7% of those age 65 or over.

References

Villages in Macoupin County, Illinois
Villages in Illinois